João Diogo Campos Caminata (born 4 January 1995) is a Portuguese professional footballer who plays for CD Cinfães on loan from União da Madeira as a forward.

Football career
On 17 September 2016, Caminata made his professional debut with União da Madeira in a 2016–17 LigaPro match against Sporting Covilhã.

References

External links

Portuguese League profile 

1995 births
Sportspeople from Funchal
Living people
Portuguese footballers
Association football forwards
S.C.U. Torreense players
Portuguese expatriate footballers
Expatriate footballers in North Macedonia
Portuguese expatriate sportspeople in North Macedonia
C.F. União players
C.D. Cinfães players
Liga Portugal 2 players